D67 may refer to:

D. 67, Trio "Frisch atmet des Morgens lebendiger Hauch" for two tenors and bass (1813) by Franz Schubert
Greek destroyer Panther (D67) Cannon-class destroyer escort built for the United States Navy during World War II
HMAS Torrens (D67), River-class torpedo-boat destroyer of the Royal Australian Navy (RAN)
HMS Carlisle (D67), C-class light cruiser of the Royal Navy, named after the English City of Carlisle
HMS Tyrian (D67) or HMS Tyrian (R67), S-class destroyer built for the Royal Navy during the Second World War
HMS Wishart (D67), Modified W-class destroyer of the British Royal Navy that saw service in World War II
INS Mormugao (D67), the second ship of the Visakhapatnam-class stealth guided-missile destroyers of the Indian Navy